Surdu may refer to:

 An alternative spelling of surdo, a Brazilian drum
 Romeo Surdu, (born 1984), Romanian footballer
 Victor Surdu (1947 – 2011), Romanian politician who served as the country's first post-Communist Minister of Agriculture
 Surdu River, a tributary of the Râul Mare in Romania

Surdul 
 Ștefan Surdul, Ruler of Wallachia from May 1591 to August 1592

See also 
 Surduc (disambiguation)
 Surducu (disambiguation)
 Surdila (disambiguation)
 Surdești (disambiguation)

Romanian-language surnames